Hope University (HU) is a national not-for-profit, cost recovering higher education establishment in Hargeisa, the capital of Somaliland. It was founded in 2008 by Najib Sheikh Abdulkarim. The institution aims to provide affordable higher learning opportunities in the fields of health, technology and management sciences.

External links
Hope University 
Hope University Mogadishu 

Universities in Somaliland
Educational institutions established in 2008
2008 establishments in Somalia
Organisations based in Hargeisa